Zahid Saeed (born July 5, 1981 in Alo Mahar, Punjab) is a right-handed Pakistani cricketer who bowls left-arm at a fast-medium pace. He played for Pakistan in the U-19 Cricket World Cup in both 1998 and 2000, finishing as the leading wicket-taker in the 2000 tournament.  He was once fined by the PCB for ball tampering during the Ramadan Cup in 2002. Cricketer Bilal Asif is his nephew.

He played for Bromyard Cricket Club as an overseas player from 2003 to 2006 and has lived in Bromyard since 2006, playing as a non overseas player for the club up to the present day.

References

External links
 Story

1981 births
Living people
Pakistani cricketers
Gujranwala cricketers
National Bank of Pakistan cricketers
Sialkot Stallions cricketers
Sialkot cricketers